Modern Pentathlon World Cup is an annual series of modern pentathlon competitions organised by the International Modern Pentathlon Union (UIPM). Competitions are held in a number of countries and each series culminates in a World Cup Final. It is the top level annual series for the sport.

The 2010 edition had its world cup final in Moscow and the 2014 series has its final in Sarasota Bradenton.

Winners of the World Cup Final

Host venues

References

External links
 Official UIPM website

 
World Cup
Modern Pentathlon